Falling Fast may refer to:

 "Falling Fast", a song by Eyes Set to Kill 
 "Falling Fast", a song by Avril Lavigne